The Worshipful Company of Brewers is a livery company of the City of London, ranked 14th in the companies's order of precedence. Its origins can be traced back with certainty to 1292, although it probably existed in some form up to a century earlier as the Guild of Our Lady and St Thomas Becket. Its successor, the Mistery of Free Brewers, were granted the right by the Mayor and Aldermen of London to appoint Masters and Wardens in 1406. Henry VI granted the first of a series of Royal Charters to the company in 1437–38. Until the last century, the company admitted non-brewers so that they could be represented by a livery company. From the mid-16th century, masters were elected annually; all of those whose names are known are listed below.

List of masters 
A continuous list of masters is available from the early 18th century. The list is mostly complete from 1563, although several gaps are present.

References 

 
Brewing in London